Langelurillus is a spider genus of the family Salticidae (jumping spiders). All the described species occur only in Africa.

Species
, the World Spider Catalog accepted the following species:

Langelurillus alboguttatus Wesolowska & Russell-Smith, 2000 – Tanzania
Langelurillus cedarbergensis Haddad & Wesolowska, 2013 – South Africa
Langelurillus furcatus Wesolowska & Russell-Smith, 2000 – Kenya, Tanzania
Langelurillus holmi Próchniewicz, 1994 – Kenya
Langelurillus horrifer Rollard & Wesolowska, 2002 – Guinea
Langelurillus ignorabilis Wesolowska & Cumming, 2008 – Zimbabwe
Langelurillus kenyaensis Dawidowicz & Wesolowska, 2016 – Kenya
Langelurillus krugeri Wesolowska & Haddad, 2013 – South Africa
Langelurillus lacteus Sanap, Joglekar & Caleb, 2017 – India
Langelurillus manifestus Wesolowska & Russell-Smith, 2000 – Tanzania
Langelurillus minutus Wesolowska & Cumming, 2011 – Namibia, Zimbabwe
Langelurillus namibicus Wesolowska, 2011 – Namibia, South Africa
Langelurillus nigritus (Berland & Millot, 1941) – Guinea, Ivory Coast, Nigeria
Langelurillus onyx Sanap, Joglekar & Caleb, 2017 – India
Langelurillus orbicularis Wesolowska & Cumming, 2008 – Zimbabwe
Langelurillus primus Próchniewicz, 1994 (type species) – Kenya
Langelurillus quadrimaculatus Wesolowska & A. Russell-Smith, 2011 – Nigeria
Langelurillus rufus (Lessert, 1925) – Ethiopia, Tanzania
Langelurillus sibandai Wesolowska, 2011 – Zimbabwe
Langelurillus spinosus Próchniewicz, 1994 – Kenya
Langelurillus squamiger Wesołowska & Haddad, 2018 – South Africa

References

Salticidae
Salticidae genera
Spiders of Africa